Rivière-Ouelle is a town located in the Kamouraska Regional County Municipality within the Bas-Saint-Laurent region of Quebec. It is located on the Saint Lawrence River; the Ouelle River flows through the town. It was part of the seignory of La Bouteillerie, once owned by Charles Deschamps de Boishébert et de Raffetot.  Jean-Charles Chapais, a Father of Canadian Confederation, was born here.

Geography

Rivière-Ouelle lies on the south shore of the Saint Lawrence River.

Communities and locations
The following designated areas are within the municipality's boundaries:
De Saint-Just – a hamlet located on Route 132
Pointe-aux-Orignaux – a hamlet located on Anse de Mercier (Mercier Bay)
Pointe-de-Rivière-Ouelle – a hamlet located on the shore of the Saint Lawrence River

Municipal council
 Mayor: Roger Richard
 Councillors: Éric Bérubé, Gilles Hudon, Gilles Levesque, Dominic Morin, Marie-Pierre Richard, Daniel Scherer

See also
 List of municipalities in Quebec

References

External links
 

Municipalities in Quebec
Incorporated places in Bas-Saint-Laurent